Jonathan Richard Shewchuk is a Professor in Computer Science at the University of California, Berkeley.

He obtained his B.S. in Physics and Computing Science from Simon Fraser University in 1990, and his M.S. and Ph.D. in Computer Science from Carnegie Mellon University, the latter in 1997.

He conducts research in scientific computing, computational geometry (especially mesh generation, numerical robustness, and surface reconstruction), numerical methods, and physically based animation.

He is also the author of Three Sins of Authors In Computer Science And Math.

In 2003 he was awarded J. H. Wilkinson Prize for Numerical Software for writing the Triangle software package which computes high-quality unstructured triangular meshes.

He appears in online course videos of CS 61B: Data Structures class in University of California, Berkeley.

References

External links
Homepage at Berkeley
Homepage at CMU
Tetrahedral Meshes with Good Dihedral Angles video of presentation at North Carolina State University in 2007

Researchers in geometric algorithms
UC Berkeley College of Engineering faculty
Simon Fraser University alumni
Carnegie Mellon University alumni
Living people
People from Cranbrook, British Columbia
Year of birth missing (living people)